In proof theory, proof nets are a geometrical method of representing proofs that
eliminates two forms of bureaucracy that differentiate proofs: (A) irrelevant syntactical features of regular proof calculi, and (B) the order of rules applied in a derivation.  In this way, the formal properties of proof identity correspond more closely to the intuitively desirable properties.  Proof nets were introduced by Jean-Yves Girard. This distinguishes proof nets from regular proof calculi such as the natural deduction calculus and the sequent calculus, where these phenomena are present.

For instance, these two linear logic proofs are identical:

And their corresponding nets will be the same.

Correctness criteria 
Several correctness criteria are known to check if a sequential proof structure (i.e. something which seems to be a proof net) is actually a concrete proof structure (i.e. something which encodes a valid derivation in linear logic). The first such criterion is the long-trip criterion which was described by Jean-Yves Girard.

See also
 Linear logic
 Ludics
 Geometry of interaction
 Coherent space
 Deep inference
 Interaction nets

References

Sources 
 Proofs and Types.  Girard J-Y, Lafont Y, and Taylor P.  Cambridge Press, 1989.
 Roberto Di Cosmo and Vincent Danos, The Linear Logic Primer
 Sean A. Fulop, A survey of proof nets and matrices for substructural logics

Proof theory